Barbara Bangura (born 13 November 1958) is a Sierra Leonean women's rights activist. She is the National Co-Ordinator of the Women's Solidarity Support Group.

Early life and education
Barbara Thaimu Bangura was born in Belfast, Northern Ireland on 13 November 1958.

Career
She is a Sierra Leonean community organizer, non-violence trainer and peace activist.

Gender Equality Draft Bill
In 2012, Bangura collaborated on the Gender Equality Draft Bill with Bernadette Lahai and Salamatu Kamara.

References

Living people
Sierra Leonean feminists
21st-century Sierra Leonean women politicians
21st-century Sierra Leonean politicians
Sierra Leone women's rights activists
1958 births